Majd al-Din Hamgar (1210 – 1287), also known as Majd-i Hamgar, was a Persian poet and courtier of the 13th-century. While most likely born in Yazd, he is regularly referred to as "Shirazi", and often referred to himself as "Majd-i Parsi", which connects him to the southwestern Iranian region of Pars (Fars).

References

Sources 
 
 

13th-century Iranian writers
1210 births
1287 deaths
Ilkhanate-period poets
Poets of the Salghurids